Pir Bast-e Luleman (also Romanized as Pīr Bast-e Lūlemān; also known as Pīr Bas, Pīr Bast, and Pirebast) is a village in Luleman Rural District, Kuchesfahan District, Rasht County, Gilan Province, Iran. At the 2006 census, its population was 3,175, in 907 families.

References 

Populated places in Rasht County